Hulchul is a 2019 Indian Telugu-language comedy thriller film starring newcomer Rudraksh Utkam and Dhanya Balakrishna. The film premiered on 3 January 2020.

Plot 
After returning from Dubai, Rudra receives a purse and a hulchul (drink) from his friend. He is told to give the drink to Narasimha. In a sudden turn of events, Rudra drinks the hulchul and imagines that his girlfriend, Swathi, is always in front of him. A villain and his gang comes to retrieve the purse and the hulchul. How Rudra fixes this issue forms the rest of the story.

Cast  
Rudraksh Utkam as Rudra
Dhanya Balakrishna as Swathi
Preeti Nigam as Rudra's mother
Krishnudu as Rudra's friend
Madhunandan
Ravi Prakash
Gemini Suresh
 Shanmukh
 Jogi Naidu
 Banda Raghu

Production 
Hulchul finished shooting  in May of 2018 and post-production work began that same month. The film was scheduled to release on 13 December 2019.

Reception 
The Times of India gave the film a rating of three out of five stars and wrote that "Despite the flaws, Hulchul is definitely worth a watch because it attempts to tell a different kind of tale".

References

External links 

2019 films
Indian comedy films
2010s Telugu-language films
Indian comedy thriller films
2019 comedy films
2019 thriller films